The 1903 Kentucky University Pioneers football team represented Kentucky University, today known as Transylvania University, during the 1903 college football season. The team claimed a championship of the south. Nash Buckingham rated Kentucky University and Vanderbilt as best in the south.

A game with Purdue was scheduled; derailed by the Purdue Wreck.

Former Yale quarterback John de Saulles credited end  Lois Thompson as playing "a better end than any man in the South." Later Lexington mayor Hogan Yancey was a star fullback on the team.

Schedule

Season summary

Week 7: Indiana

Kentucky University defeated the Indiana Hoosiers 18 to 5. Zora Clevenger scored Indiana's lone touchdown.

The starting lineup for Kentucky University against Indiana: Simpson (left end), Woodard (left tackle), Ware (left guard), Miller (center), Kelly (right guard), Wallace (right tackle), Thompson (right end), Pyle (quarterback), Cantrill (left halfback), H. Yancey (right halfback), Knight (fullback)

Week 8: vs. Kentucky State

A fear of riots plagued this contest ever since their second-team played Kentucky State.

Awards and honors
 All-Southern: Lois Thompson

References

Kentucky University
Transylvania Pioneers football seasons
Kentucky University football